A jupe referred to a loose-fitting wool jacket or tunic for men. It was later restricted to an item of women's and children's clothing.

The term has now disappeared but was used up until the 19th century. Usage of this meaning of jupe for menswear became restricted to "jupe panels" in jackets. (In French the word jupe means "skirt.")

See also

Harem pants, or jupe-culotte, jupe-sultane and jupe-pantalon

References

Jackets